is a dating simulation series by Konami. It consists of six main games in addition to many spin-offs. The games are notable in the dating sim genre for being highly nonlinear. Their nickname amongst their fans is the contraction TokiMemo.

The gameplay in Tokimeki Memorial focuses on scheduling, dating, and stat-building. The player has limited time to allocate between asking out members of the opposite sex and developing the playable character's abilities at school and sport (with the long-term goal of becoming more seductive, not out of any intrinsic value). Dates are frequent but very brief, with usually only one multiple-choice question to determine whether the partner's love meter will increase or decrease. One playthrough lasts for a fixed period of three years of high school (on the order of 5–10 hours of play), at the end of which the character with the highest love meter confesses their love.

Game list

Related media

Manga

Several manga based on the series have been released:
  it is a manga based on the first game, it was released on March 10, 1998, and it is part of Konami Parody Comics.
  it is a manga based on the game of same name, it was released for manga on July 1, 2006, in Japan and published by B's-LOG COMIC.
  is a Three Digital Comics based on the video game Tokimeki Memorial ONLINE. It was released for Digital Mobiles Mangas in February 2008 in Japan only. It is part of Konami Weekly Magazine.
  is a digital comic based on the game Tokimeki Memorial Girl's Side. It was released for Digital Mobile Manga on March 29, 2008, in Japan. It is part of Konami Weekly Maganzine.

Anime

In 1999, a two-episode anime OVA based on the first game was produced by Studio Pierrot.

In 2006, Tokimeki Memorial Online was adapted into a 25-episode anime television series, Tokimeki Memorial Only Love, produced by Konami Digital Entertainment Co., Ltd. and Anime International Company (AIC) and based on Tokimeki Memorial Online, which premiered across Japan on October 2, 2006.

In 2009, an OVA adaptation of Tokimeki Memorial 4 called Hajimari no Finder, directed by Hanyuu Naoyasu, was produced by Asahi Production.

Live-action Movie 
Tokimeki Memorial is a live-action movie loosely inspired by Konami's long running dating simulator franchise of the same name. It was released on August 9, 1997 and was distributed by Toei. This movie is the final movie produced for Fuji TV's "Our movie series".

Spin-offs and merchandise
Tokimeki Memorial spin-offs and merchandise include:
 Numerous related video games:
 Two puzzle games based on the first game: Tokimeki Memorial Taisen Puzzle Dama (released in arcades, for Windows 95, PlayStation, and Sega Saturn) and Tokimeki Memorial Taisen Tokkae Dama (released for the PlayStation and Sega Saturn. The former was released on the PlayStation Store on January 13, 2010.
 One puzzle game based on the second game: Tokimeki Memorial 2 Puzzle Dama (released for the PlayStation).
 The Tokimeki Memorial 2 Substories series, consisting of three games (each game focuses on three of the girls from Tokimemo 2 with the exception of the last game which focuses on four girls). The games are highly regarded for the mini-games in each game. The first game in the series, Dancing Summer Vacation focuses on Miyuki Kotobuki, Kaori Yae and the series' first (and so far, only) set of twins, Miho Shirayuki & Maho Shirayuki. The mini-game for this game revolves around one of Konami's other famous game series, Dance Dance Revolution using remixed Tokimeki Memorial 1 and 2 songs. The second game ("Leaping School Festival") focuses on Ichimonji Akane, Akai Homura and Ijuuin Mei. Unlike the other two Substories games there are three mini games in this game (one for each girl). The final game in the series, "Memories Ringing On" focuses on Hikari Hinomoto, Kasumi Asou, Kotoko Minazuki and Kaedeko Sakura. There are two mini-games in this game (Bowling and Billiards). Most girls appear in each game and can also be won but the characters that are not at the center of the game do not get as much story as the main heroines of the corresponding game.
 Tokimeki Memorial 2 Music Video Clips: Circus de Aimashou ("Let's Meet At The Circus") which was released on the PlayStation 2. The game concentrates on 5 girls from the Tokimeki Memorial 2 game (the girls being Sumire Nozaki, Hikari Hinomoto, Kasumi Asou, Kaori Yae, Homura Akai and Mei Ijuuin). Essentially being a collection of mini-games revolving around Sumire, players are able to choose one of the aforementioned girls before competing in the mini-games and if they play through and win the mini-games they are treated to an animated music video set to one of the chosen girl's image songs.
 Tokimeki Memorial Private Collection (for the PlayStation), features a mini-game where the player pick one of the girls from Tokimemo 1 as a partner and she asks questions based on TokiMemo 1 (the questions would revolve around the girl—i.e.: her birthday, phone number, favorite items etc.). If the users correctly answer ten questions they are able to go to the beach with her and see her in her outfit.
 Tokimeki no Houkago, a quiz game for the PlayStation where the players pick one of the other female characters from Tokimemo 1 as own partner and try to win her. Unlike the Private Collection game this game contains questions on general real life topics (and not the actual Tokimeki series) of the time (sport, manga, books etc.). This is the only time in the game's series (for Tokimeki Memorial 1–3) where the players can also win with a male character. They can pick Yoshio Saotome (the info otaku where they get all the information on the girls) as own partner. There is an ending with him where is possible both make a promise to each other to find a girlfriend. Essentially this is like the "Bad Ending" from Tokimemo 1 only with pictures added. Also this game expands on the endings from Tokimemo 1 somewhat in that the players get to see pictures of them (with some slight animation) corresponding to their endings. For example, Ayako Katagiri wants to go to Paris to go to an art school. Her ending involves the players seeing her off at the airport (accompanied by a picture).
 Tokimeki Memorial Selection—Fujisaki Shiori is a game devoted to Shiori Fujisaki, the main heroine from Tokimemo 1. There is not much gameplay involved, as the game consists of an image gallery, two animated music videos and a mini game where you play Rock, Paper, Scissors with Shiori.
 A series of three romantic drama/adventure games, or visual novels, were also released for the PlayStation and the Sega Saturn, each one focusing on a specific girl from TokiMemo 1. The first was Nijiiro no Seishun ("Rainbow-colored Youth",) featuring Saki Nijino, who cheers the player on as the latter spends the game trying to make it on the school soccer team's main line up. The second game, Irodori no Love Song ("The Many Hues of a Love Song"), focused on Katagiri Ayako with the player trying to compose a new song in time to win the school festival's band contest. The third and final drama game was Tabidachi no Uta ("Poem of Journeys") and featured both Shiori Fujisaki and Miharu Tatebayashi sharing a similar story about the player running a marathon just before graduation that branches off into different directions depending on which girl the players choose to pursue. The Drama series was developed by Hideo Kojima (of Metal Gear fame).
 A music game Tokimeki Idol was released for iOS and Android in early 2018.
 Several Konami crossover games have included characters from the series:
 The 2006 mobile phone game Konami Wai Wai Sokoban features Shiori Fujisaki as a playable character.
 Super Bomberman R includes Shiori Fujisaki Bomber and Ayako Katagiri Bomber as playable characters.
 In episode #13 of GameCenter CX (known as "Retro Game Master" outside Japan), Shinya Arino, the host of the show, played through the PlayStation version of the game and successfully cleared it.

See also
 Akari Uchida, a game designer who directed and/or produced multiple titles in the Tokimeki Memorial series.
 LovePlus, a similar dating sim series also from Konami and Akari Uchida.

References

External links

 
 

 
1999 anime OVAs
Anime films based on video games
Japan-exclusive video games
Konami franchises
OVAs based on video games
Pierrot (company)
Video game franchises introduced in 1994
ASCII Media Works manga